Iván Darío Sandoval (born 5 August 1995) is an Argentine professional footballer who plays as a forward for Defensores de Belgrano.

Career
Sandoval played for Fundación Godoy Cruz before he signed for Argentinos Juniors. In June 2016, Fénix of Primera B Metropolitana loaned Sandoval. He scored three goals in four matches during the following November, netting goals against Talleres, Excursionistas and Tristán Suárez. He returned to his parent club six months later, having scored four goals (all at home) in eighteen games. On 21 July 2017, Sandoval joined Venezuelan Segunda División side Margarita on loan. Sandoval scored two in a Copa Venezuela third stage first leg vs. Deportivo Anzoátegui in August as Margarita eliminated the Venezuelan Primera División club.

July 2018 saw Sandoval depart out on loan again, this time signing for Primera C Metropolitana's Cañuelas. He came back following three goals and fifteen appearances, prior to leaving Argentinos Juniors permanently to sign for fourth tier team Argentino.

Ahead of the 2021 season, Sandoval signed with Defensores de Belgrano.

Career statistics
.

References

External links

1995 births
Living people
Sportspeople from Mendoza, Argentina
Argentine footballers
Association football forwards
Argentine expatriate footballers
Expatriate footballers in Venezuela
Argentine expatriate sportspeople in Venezuela
Primera B Metropolitana players
Primera C Metropolitana players
Argentinos Juniors footballers
Club Atlético Fénix players
Margarita F.C. players
Cañuelas footballers
Argentino de Quilmes players
Defensores de Belgrano footballers